Apalachee may refer to:

People 
 Apalachee people, historical tribe from the Florida Panhandle

Places 
Apalachee, Georgia, an unincorporated community
Apalachee Bay, a bay of the Gulf of Mexico
Apalachee Province, an area of what is now the Florida Panhandle historically inhabited by the Apalachee
Apalachee River (Alabama), a river in the U.S. state of Alabama
Apalachee River (Georgia), a river in the U.S. state of Georgia

Other
 Apalachee (horse), a thoroughbred racehorse
 Apalachee language, an extinct Muskogean language
 Talimali Band of Apalachee Indians, a nonprofit organization in Louisiana